Major-General Edward Sebastian Burke-Gaffney (1900–1981) was a British Army officer who commanded Aldershot District.

Military career
Burke-Gaffney was commissioned into the Royal Artillery in 1920. In 1933 he became the Officer Commanding the Gentleman Cadets at the Royal Military Academy, Woolwich. He served in World War II as a staff officer responsible for co-ordination and supply at Army Headquarters in India. After the War became a brigadier at Scottish Command. He was appointed General Officer Commanding Aldershot District in 1953 and retired in 1954.

References

External links
Generals of World War II

 

1900 births
1981 deaths
British Army major generals
Royal Artillery officers
British Army brigadiers of World War II
Academics of the Royal Military Academy, Woolwich